The Prins Frederik Willem was a Dutch 68-gun third rate ship of the line of the navy of the Dutch Republic, the Batavian Navy, and the Royal Navy.
The order to construct the ship was given by the Admiralty of the Meuse.

In 1795, the ship was renamed Gelijkheid (Equality).
On 11 October 1797 the Gelijkheid took part in the Battle of Camperdown. The ship was captured by the British and renamed HMS Gelykheid.

In 1799, the Gelykheid was a prison ship at Chatham. In November 1803 the ship was stationed in the Humber as a guardship.
In 1807, Gelykheid was fitted out as sheer hulk at Falmouth, and she was disposed of in 1814.

References

Ships of the line of the Dutch Republic
Ships of the line of the Batavian Republic
Ships of the line of the Royal Navy
Ships built in the Netherlands
1770s ships
Maritime incidents in 1797